The Bull's Head is a Grade II listed public house at 15 Strand-on-the-Green, Chiswick, London, England. The building (Grade II listed in 1970) is 18th century with later additions; the architect is not known. It is a two-storey white-painted brick building, and still has its pantile roof with two dormer windows. The entrance has a moulded doorhood resting on brackets. Inside, the pub's bar and drinking area consists of numerous rooms on different levels; the lowest room is the "Duck & Grouse" restaurant.

It is adjoined by nos 10 to 14, Bull Cottages, also 18th century; they suffered flood damage from high tides, and were restored in 1967. The actor Donald Pleasence lived in the house at the end of the Bull's Head buildings, marked by a blue plaque.

An unlikely legend maintains that Oliver Cromwell stayed in the pub, then escaping to the nearby Oliver's Island and hiding there; there is no reliable evidence for either claim.

References

Grade II listed buildings in the London Borough of Hounslow
Grade II listed pubs in London
Chiswick
Pubs in the London Borough of Hounslow
Buildings and structures in Chiswick